F.C. Copenhagen School of Excellence and FCK 2 are the youth and reserve team of F.C. Copenhagen. The under-19 team is member of the Danish U19 League and the newly established Future Cup. The team usually consists of young players and reserves from the Superliga-squad. The under-19 team is coached by Alfred Johansson. Other youth teams are coached by Martin Vingaard and Jonas Rothausen.

Under-19 squad
As of 26 January 2023

Under-17 squad
As of 1 January 2023

References

F.C. Copenhagen
Copenhagen
Copenhagen